Bykovka is a rural locality (a village) in Sylvenskoye Rural Settlement, Permsky District, Perm Krai, Russia. The population was 13 as of 2010.

Geography 
Bykovka is located on the Sylva River, 38 km east of Perm (the district's administrative centre) by road.

References 

Rural localities in Permsky District